Gerdus van der Walt (born 20 April 1995) is a South African rugby union player for Kamaishi Seawaves in the Top League Cup in Japan. His regular position is centre.

Career

He was also selected to represent the s in the Under-19 Provincial Championship just a month later. He made seven appearances in the competition – all of those as a replacement – as the Golden Lions finished second on the log and reached the final of the competition, where they lost to the s.

Van der Walt again appeared for their Under-19s in the 2014 Under-19 Provincial Championship, having firmly established himself as their first-choice inside centre, starting all twelve of their matches in that position. He scored tries in their matches against the s and the s, but could not help the team qualify for the semi-finals as they ended the season in fifth position.

He made eleven starts for the s in the 2015 Under-21 Provincial Championship Group A, scoring tries in five of those matches to help them finish fourth on the log.

Van der Walt was included in the ' Currie Cup starting line-up for the final match of the 2015 Currie Cup Premier Division regular season.

Personal life

Van der Walt is the younger brother of fly-half Jaco van der Walt.

References

1995 births
Alumni of Monument High School
Living people
Golden Lions players
Kamaishi Seawaves players
Rugby union centres
Rugby union players from Potchefstroom
Shizuoka Blue Revs players
South African rugby union players